Sarah Leah Borwell (born 20 August 1979) is an English former professional tennis player who enjoyed her greatest success in doubles. She was the British number one in doubles. Her career-high doubles ranking is 65, set on 9 August 2010 and her career-high singles ranking is 199, which she reached on 10 July 2006.

Early life
Borwell was born in Middlesbrough. She attended Nunthorpe School, where Jonathan Woodgate and Liam Plunkett were fellow students, she even shared a class and school football team with Woodgate who is a year her junior at The Avenue Primary school, where dual year classes were present. She was a regular player for the Schools boys football team, more than holding her own and deserving her place in the team. and Prior Pursglove College in Guisborough. She won a tennis scholarship to the University of Houston, where she was ranked as high as #8 in the NCAA and completed a business degree.

Her father is a scout at Aston Villa F.C., and her mother coaches Mini Tennis and is a supervisor for school sports.

Career

2002
Borwell made her professional debut in August 2002 at the ITF Circuit tournament held in Bath, England where she suffered a first round defeat. She played four more tournaments that year and reached the quarterfinals of two of them (both on clay). The season ended with Borwell ranked world No. 744.

2003
She began 2003 with another quarter-final loss in January and two months later made her first appearance in an ITF tournament final, losing in straight sets to Australian Lisa McShea, 6–1, 6–4. She notched up one more semifinal loss and another quarterfinal loss in ITF events before making her debut on the WTA Tour at the Tier III DFS Classic held in Birmingham. She experienced a defeat in the first round of qualifying at the hands of a young future world No. 1, Maria Sharapova. Borwell was then granted a wildcard into the qualifying event of her home Grand Slam, Wimbledon, where she was defeated in straight sets by Argentine Gisela Dulko in the first round. She spent the rest of the year on the ITF Circuit, reaching two more semifinals (one as a qualifier), and finished 2003 ranked 349.

2004
2004 was a year of first and second round defeats for Borwell. She played the entire year on the ITF Circuit, reaching only one quarterfinal and one semifinal (albeit as a qualifier) and as such her year-end ranking fell 68 places to No. 417.

2005
She made a more promising start to 2005, reaching the quarterfinals in her second ITF tournament of the season and the semifinals in her third. She again played on the ITF Circuit until June when she was again given a wildcard into the Tier III Birmingham Classic qualifying rounds. She managed to go one better than her previous year's appearance at the tournament by beating 16th seed Sunitha Rao in three tight sets, before losing to eighth seed Rika Fujiwara from Japan. Another wildcard followed, but this time into the main draw of Wimbledon where her opponent in round one was American, Shenay Perry. Despite a valiant performance in a first set tie-break (which she eventually lost 11–13) she lost the match in two sets. The rest of her year was spent playing ITF tournaments where she reached one quarterfinal. She did, however, beat two women ranked higher than herself to qualify for the Tier III Bell Challenge held in Quebec City, Canada in November. She lost in the first round to Emma Laine of Finland. 2005 ended with Borwell ranked 331.

2006
In February 2006, Borwell attempted to qualify for the Bangalore Open, a Tier III tournament held in India. She lost to Akgul Amanmuradova, 2–6, 1–6. March saw success for Borwell as she reached the semifinals of ITF Sunderland before losing to Gaëlle Widmer, 1–6, 3–6. This was immediately followed by her first ever title in Sheffield where she did not drop a single set en route to the final in which she defeated Nadja Roma in three sets. Two consecutive first-round losses followed before a quarterfinal loss to Anne Keothavong in the ITF tournament held in Madras. May saw another ITF final appearance for Borwell in Nagano where she was forced to retire after losing a close first set 7–5 to Tomoko Yonemura. In June, Borwell had her first victory in the main draw of a WTA Tour event after being given a wildcard into the Birmingham Classic and defeating fellow Briton Melanie South in three sets. Jamea Jackson beat her in the second round. Two consecutive wild cards followed, the first into the main draw of the Eastbourne International (where she did not make it past the first round) and the second into the main draw of Wimbledon. She had a shock victory here by winning her first-round match against world No. 66, Marta Domachowska, 6–3, 6–7, 6–4. This set up a second round match against future world No. 1, Ana Ivanovic, which she lost, 1–6, 2–6. Following Wimbledon, Borwell reached the quarterfinals of one ITF tournament that year and was beaten in the first round of qualifying of the US Open by Stéphanie Cohen-Aloro. Her ranking was 218 at the end of this season.

2007
From January to June 2007, Borwell played on the ITF Circuit. She reached three quarterfinals in this time. Then she participated in the French Open qualifying tournament where she was beaten by Stéphanie Dubois. She lost in qualifying for the Birmingham Classic, Eastbourne International and Wimbledon before reaching the quarterfinals of the ITF tournament held in Felixstowe. Her next tournament was another ITF event, this one held in Frinton where she defeated fellow Brit Jade Curtis in the final, 6–4, 1–6, 6–3. The second ITF title of her career. This was followed by another quarterfinal appearance in an ITF tournament before she lost in the qualifying rounds for three consecutive WTA tournaments. One more quarter-final in an ITF event rounded off her results for 2007. She finished the year at a ranking of 264.

2008
Borwell spent most of 2008 playing on the ITF Circuit, reaching two consecutive finals in March in Dijon and Bath. She lost the first to Olga Brózda and won the second by defeating Stéphanie Vongsouthi. In July she reached her only other singles final of the ITF season in the Felixstowe tournament, losing to Neuza Silva, 3–6, 2–6. Her participation on the WTA Tour that year consisted of four losing efforts as she attempted to qualify for the Birmingham Classic, the Slovenia Open, the Nordic Light Open and the Bell Challenge. Borwell was awarded a wildcard into the qualifying draw of Wimbledon where she was beaten by Yaroslava Shvedova, 6–4, 6–7, 6–4. In November, Borwell made the decision to stop playing singles and become a doubles specialist.

2009–2010
With her doubles ranking high enough for her to enter the main draw of many WTA tournaments without having to qualify. She reached the quarterfinals of four International tournaments: Birmingham Classic, Hobart International, Mexican Open and the Monterrey Open. She also made the semifinal of the main tour event in Bad Gastein. In 2010 Borwell teamed up full-time with American Raquel Kops-Jones. So far, they had made three quarterfinals but their highlight has been a semifinal in the WTA events at Ponte Vedra Beach and Stanford.

Both the French Open and Wimbledon proved to be a frustrating experience for Borwell and Kops-Jones. Although sandwiched between both tournaments, they picked up an ITF title in Nottingham (defeating Naomi Broady and Katie O'Brien in the final) they suffered first round defeats in both major events. At the French they came up against nemesis' and eventual finalists Katarina Srebotnik and Květa Peschke and were thrashed 6–0, 6–1. At Wimbledon, they played a high quality game against fifth seeds Liezel Huber and Bethanie Mattek-Sands. They played the first two centre court before bad light forced the match to be resumed the next day, at one set all. where Huber and Mattek prevailed 7–5 in the decider. Borwell did, however, win a round with Colin Fleming in the mixed doubles, before losing in the second to top seeds Nenad Zimonjić and Sam Stosur.

In July, Borwell teamed up with Martina Hingis and Scoville Jenkins to form the New York Buzz team at the World TeamTennis championships. Although they struggled and were the least successful team, Borwell and Jenkins registered a very impressive Mixed Doubles success against John McEnroe and Kim Clijsters.

At the Silicon Valley Classic, Borwell and Jones caused a huge upset in round one as they defeated Lisa Raymond and Rennae Stubbs, 6–0, 4–6, [12–10]. On the win Borwell said 'We deserved that.' They reached the semifinal despite Borwell being hit on the head with a 10–6 champion tie-break win against Lilia Osterloh and Riza Zalameda, Borwell said this win was more important than their first-round win. The blow to the head, Borwell received in that match turned out to be a brain bleed that kept her out of action for about a month, causing her to miss the US Open.

Borwell returned to action at the Commonwealth Games in Delhi, competing for England in both the women's and mixed doubles. Anna Smith and Ken Skupski were her respective partners. Borwell and Smith were seeded second, however could not live up to that ranking losing their quarterfinal match in straight sets. Borwell and Skupski, however, combined well eventually winning the bronze medal, defeating Smith and partner Ross Hutchins.

2011–2012
In 2011, Borwell reached the first round of both the Australian Open and the Wimbledon Championships but lost both times.

ITF finals

Singles: 7 (3–4)

Doubles: 13 (8–5)

Performance timelines

Singles

Doubles

Mixed doubles

Fed Cup

References

External links

 
 
 

1979 births
Living people
English expatriate sportspeople in the United States
English female tennis players
Houston Cougars women's tennis players
Sportspeople from Middlesbrough
Commonwealth Games bronze medallists for England
Tennis players at the 2010 Commonwealth Games
Commonwealth Games medallists in tennis
British female tennis players
Tennis people from North Yorkshire
Medallists at the 2010 Commonwealth Games